Vasum suwanneensis is an extinct species of medium to large sea snail, a marine gastropod mollusk in the family Turbinellidae.

Description
Measurements of the (incomplete) shell: 39.0 x 23.0 mm.

Distribution
Fossils of this species were found in Oligocene strata in Florida, USA.

References

 E. J. Petuch. 1997. A new gastropod fauna from an Oligocene back-reef lagoonal environment in west central Florida. The Nautilus 110(4):122-138

External links

suwanneensis
Gastropods described in 1997